Kretków  is a village in the administrative district of Gmina Żerków, within Jarocin County, Greater Poland Voivodeship, in west-central Poland.

In 1891 owner of Kretków was Hipolit Drogosław Skórzewski.

The village has a population of 170.

References

Villages in Jarocin County